Buruaga is a hamlet and council located in the municipality of Zigoitia, in Álava province, Basque Country, Spain. As of 2020, it has a population of 45.

Geography 
Buruaga is located 15km north of Vitoria-Gasteiz.

References

Populated places in Álava